Richard Arthur Mattiussi (born May 1, 1938) is a Canadian former professional ice hockey defenceman who played in the National Hockey League.

Playing career
Mattiussi played 200 games for the Pittsburgh Penguins and  Oakland/California Seals in the 1960s and 70s. He was known as a hard-nosed grinder in the corners and spent much of his career in the AHL. Following 200 NHL games Mattiussi had recorded 8 goals and 31 assists for 39 points. Upon retirement he went on to coach the Rochester Americans of the AHL in the 1975 and 1976 seasons.

Career statistics

Regular season and playoffs

Coaching statistics

Transactions
 June 7, 1962 – Traded to Springfield (AHL) by Toronto (Rochester-AHL) with Jim Wilcox, Bill White, Roger Cote and the loan of Wally Boyer for Kent Douglas.
 October 16, 1962 – Traded to Cleveland (AHL) by Springfield (AHL) for Wayne Larkin and Murray Davison.
 August 11, 1966 – Traded to Pittsburgh by Cleveland (AHL) for cash.
 October, 1966 – Loaned to Cleveland (AHL) by Pittsburgh for the 1966-67 season for cash.
 January 30, 1969 – Traded to Oakland by Pittsburgh with Earl Ingarfield and Gene Ubriaco for Bryan Watson, George Swarbrick and Tracy Pratt.
 Selected by Dayton (Houston) in WHA General Player Draft.

References

External links
 

1938 births
Living people
Baltimore Clippers players
California Golden Seals players
Canadian ice hockey defencemen
Ice hockey people from Ontario
Oakland Seals players
People from Cochrane District
Pittsburgh Hornets players
Pittsburgh Penguins players
Providence Reds players
Rochester Americans players
Toronto St. Michael's Majors players